Cheung Kong Park is a small garden located in the Central district of Hong Kong Island and named for Li Ka Shing's corporate empire. The park is privately maintained by Cheung Kong Holdings, but is open to the public. The park consists of ponds and cascades with benches for visitors to enjoy the scenery.

See also
List of urban public parks and gardens in Hong Kong

External links
 

 

Central, Hong Kong
Urban public parks and gardens in Hong Kong